Cianjur Station (CJ) is a class II railway station located in Sayang, Cianjur, Cianjur Regency, West Java, Indonesia. The station, which is located at an altitude of 439 m, is included in the Operation Area II Bandung. This station is the station with the highest passenger density on the Cianjur– route.

History

Building and layout

Cianjur Station initially had six railway tracks, including a track to the warehouse opposite the station. Since most of the Jakarta–Bandung cross trains operate via the Cikampek–Padalarang railway, the number of tracks at this station is reduced to three due to lack of traffic. The station built by Staatsspoorwegen has now been designated as a cultural heritage by the Central Unit for Conservation and Architectural Design of Kereta Api Indonesia.

Train services
Cianjur Station used to serve the Cianjuran train to fill the Bandung-Bogor route. However, the operation of the train was stopped in 2013 due to the unavailability of spare parts for diesel-hydraulic locomotives and subsidies from the Government through the Ministry of Transportation of the Republic of Indonesia.

On February 8, 2014, the station reopened with the launch of Siliwangi train.

Services 
The following is a list of train services at the Cianjur Station.

Passenger services
 Economy class

References

External links

Cianjur Regency
Railway stations in West Java
Railway stations opened in 1883